Tembeka Nicholas Ngcukaitobi (25 December 1976) is a South African lawyer, public speaker, author and political activist. He is a member of the South African Law Reform Commission (SALRC). Ngcukaitobi has authored the book The Land Is Ours: South Africa's First Black Lawyers and the birth of Constitutionalism.

Early years
Ngcukaitobi studied his undergraduate at the University of Transkei and finished his LLB at Rhodes University. Early in his career, he served as law clerk to Chief Justice Arthur Chaskalson at the Constitutional Court of South Africa. Ngcukaitobi worked at the Legal Resources Centre, a leading South African public interest law centre, first as a candidate attorney and later as Director of its Constitutional Litigation Unit.

Notable judgments
Apart from his well known role as an advocate, Ngcukaitobi is also an Acting Judge at the Land Claims Court of South Africa, with his notable work in that regard being the Msiza case. He played a critical role in the removal of the Former President of South Africa Jacob Zuma by initially arguing in the Constitutional Court on the Nkandla matter that the Public Protector's remedial actions—that the President must pay back the money claimed to be for security upgrades—were binding. The implications of such an argument was that Zuma had broken his oath of office, a view which the Court ultimately held. In what became known as the Secret Ballot case in 2017, Ngcukaitobi argued that the Speaker of the National Assembly had a discretion to allow members of parliament to vote anonymously, in a bid to oust Zuma.

Ngcukaitobi's 2021 judgment overturning the rape conviction of Loyiso Coko, ruling that by agreeing to oral sex the plaintiff had tacitly agreed to penetrative sex, was controversial drawing significant criticism from gender rights activists.

Education and Qualifications
Ngcukaitobi holds the degrees of BProc, LLB (Unitra), LLM (Rhodes) and LLM (London School of Economics). He was part of the international legal team that represented the major opposition political party in Zimbabwe after deadly elections. In 2019, he became a senior counsel after practising law as an advocate for only 8 years, an enormous achievement in light of the status typically obtained by older advocates given the 10 to 15 years minimum requirement.

References

1979 births
Living people
21st-century South African lawyers